Deh-e Daran or Deh Daran or Dehdaran may refer to:
 Dehdaran-e Olya, Bushehr Province
 Dehdaran-e Sofla, Bushehr Province
 Deh-e Daran, Kerman (ده دران - Deh-e Darān)
 Deh-e Daran, alternate name of Dahan-e Daran, Kerman Province (ده دران - Deh-e Darān)
 Deh-e Daran, Khuzestan (دهداران - Deh-e Dārān)